Stocking Glacier is a steep alpine glacier just east of Catspaw Glacier, flowing south toward Taylor Glacier in Victoria Land. So named by Taylor of the British Antarctic Expedition (1910-13) for its appearance as seen from above.

Further reading
 Kate M. Swanger, David R. Marchant, Douglas E. Kowalewski, James W. Head III, Viscous flow lobes in central Taylor Valley, Antarctica: Origin as remnant buried glacial ice, Geomorphology 120 (2010), P 174–185

Reference

Glaciers of Victoria Land
McMurdo Dry Valleys